Jack Wilkinson (17 September 1931 – 10 April 1996) was an English footballer who played as a centre-forward in the Football League for eight years. He scored 81 goals in 158 league games, a record of a goal every two appearances.

He moved from Witton Albion to Arsenal in October 1953, but featured only once for the "Gunners" before moving on to Sheffield United in March 1956. He switched to Port Vale in June 1957, and helped the "Valiants" to the Fourth Division title in 1958–59. He was sold on to Exeter City for a £2,500 fee in October 1959, before entering non-league football in 1961 with Wellington Town.

Career
Wilkinson played for Middlewich Athletic Rangers and Witton Albion, making his debut for Witton on 23 August 1952 and scoring 17 goals from 39 games in the 1952–53 season and scoring 10 goals in 14 games at the start of the 1953–54 campaign. He moved into League football with Tom Whittaker's Arsenal in October 1953. He was a reserve to Cliff Holton. He made just one competitive appearance, in a First Division game against Leicester City on 19 February 1955 which Arsenal drew 1–1. Despite consistently scoring for Arsenal's reserves he was never given another first team opportunity at Highbury, and transferred to Sheffield United in March 1956 for £5,000. Joe Mercer's "Blades" were relegated out of the top-flight with a last place finish in 1955–56, and could only manage a seventh-place finish in the Second Division in 1956–57. Wilkinson scored 16 goals in 29 league games during his time at Bramall Lane.

Wilkinson thereafter signed with Norman Low's Port Vale in June 1957, a move which suited him as his home with wife and two children was in nearby Middlewich. He scored a total of 19 goals in 44 appearances in the 1957–58 season. However his goals could not prevent the "Valiants" finishing within the lower half of the Third Division South table and thereby become founding members of the inaugural Football League Fourth Division. He then scored 21 goals in 34 games in Port Vale's campaign of 1958–59, wherein Vale stormed to promotion as the Fourth Division's inaugural champions. Some of the other members of Vale's highly effective front-line for that season included Harry Poole, Stan Steele and Noel Kinsey. Having scored just once in six league games at the start of the 1959–60 season, he was sold to Exeter City for a £2,500 fee in October 1959. Wilkinson was flown down to St James Park by helicopter to sign with the club, and went on to score on his debut for the "Grecians". He also helped Frank Broome's side post a ninth-place finish in the Fourth Division of the 1959–60 season. He was transfer-listed by his own request in January 1961 as his wife wished to move back to the Cheshire area. The club had to apply for re-election in the 1960–61 season, and despite boasting a record of 26 goals in 48 league games for Exeter, Wilkinson moved back into non-league with Wellington Town. He scored six goals in sixteen games back at Witton Albion in the 1962–63 season, and then scored a further five goals from 25 games in the 1963–64 season. He later played for Murgatroyd's and served Winsford United as a player-coach.

Career statistics
Source:

Honours
Port Vale
Football League Fourth Division: 1958–59

References

1931 births
1996 deaths
People from Middlewich
Sportspeople from Cheshire
English footballers
Association football forwards
Witton Albion F.C. players
Arsenal F.C. players
Sheffield United F.C. players
Port Vale F.C. players
Exeter City F.C. players
Telford United F.C. players
Winsford United F.C. players
English Football League players
Association football coaches